Sinéad Delahunty-Evans (born 12 February 1971 in Kilkenny) is a retired Irish middle-distance runner who competed primarily in the 1500 metres. She represented her country at the 1996 and 2000 Summer Olympics, as well as two World Championships.  she is the head coach of Cross Country/Track & Field at Brandeis University in Waltham, Massachusetts, United States.

Competition record

Personal bests
Outdoor
1500 metres – 4:04.22 (Brussels 1998)
One mile – 4:27.38 (Nice 1997)
3000 metres – 8:58 (Cambridge 1995)
5000 metres – 15:33.34 (Belgium 1995)
Indoor
1500 metres – 4:11.06+ (New York 2000)
One mile – 4:30.41 (New York 2000)
3000 metres – 8:58.58 (Atlanta 1995)

References

1971 births
Living people
Irish female middle-distance runners
Athletes (track and field) at the 1996 Summer Olympics
Athletes (track and field) at the 2000 Summer Olympics
Olympic athletes of Ireland
People from Kilkenny (city)